The 1988–89 Liga Alef season saw Hapoel Tirat HaCarmel (champions of the North Division) and Hapoel Rishon LeZion (champions of the South Division) win their regional divisions and promotion to Liga Artzit. The confirmation of Hapoel Tirat HaCarmel's promotion was delayed as the final round match between Maccabi Ahi Nazareth (who could overtake Hapoel Tirat HaCarmel) and Beitar Nahariya was abandoned. The IFA disciplinary committee ruled that Ahi Nazareth were responsible to the abandonment and set the match result to 2–0 to Beitar Nahariya. 

At the bottom, Hapoel Tira, Hapoel Kiryat Ata (from the North division), Hapoel Ramla and Hapoel Beit Shemesh (from the South division) relegated to Liga Bet.

North Division

South Division

References
Alef and Bet Leagues, 1986-87 – 1993-94  Eran R, Israblog 

Liga Alef seasons
Israel
3